Bob Richardson (born December 3, 1948) is a former Canadian Football League player.

Richardson graduated from Iowa State University, where he represented the Cyclones in the 1972 North - South all star games as an offensive lineman, though he could play tight end. In 1972, he played with the Hamilton Tiger-Cats, where he won the Gruen Trophy as the best rookie in the East and a Grey Cup championship. He would play there until 1974 and then play 4 more seasons with the Saskatchewan Roughriders, when he retired after the 1978 season.

References

1948 births
Living people
Canadian Football League Rookie of the Year Award winners
Place of birth missing (living people)
Hamilton Tiger-Cats players
Iowa State Cyclones football players
Saskatchewan Roughriders players